The Council of Governors is a United States council of state and federal officials that was established to "advise the Secretary of Defense, the Secretary of Homeland Security, and the White House Homeland Security Council on matters related to the National Guard and civil support missions" and to "strengthen further the partnership between the Federal Government and State Governments to protect [the United States] against all types of hazards". The Council is tasked to review "such matters as involving the National Guard of the various States; homeland defense; civil support; synchronization and integration of State and Federal military activities in the United States; and other matters of mutual interest pertaining to National Guard, homeland defense, and civil support activities."

The Council was authorized and required by the National Defense Authorization Act for Fiscal Year 2008, enacted by the 110th Congress and signed by President George W. Bush on January 28, 2008.

Composition 

The Council of Governors is composed of 10 members, selected by the President for a term of 2 years from among the governors of the several states and territories of the United States and the Mayor of the District of Columbia. No more than five members may be from the same political party.

Two members of the Council, of different political parties, are designated by the President to serve as Co-Chairs of the Council.

The work of the Council is coordinated by an Executive Director designated by the Secretary of Defense.

Members

Former members

Federal officials

Scope of activities 
Topics for review by the Council of Governors include synchronization and integration of state and federal military activities and other matters related to state National Guard organizations, homeland defense, and civil support.

Meetings 
Meetings of the Council are called by the Secretary of Defense or the Co-Chairs.

The inaugural meeting was held on February 23, 2010, in Washington, D.C., at the Pentagon. A second meeting was held July 11, 2010 in Boston, Massachusetts. A third meeting was scheduled for November 2010.

References

External links
FEMA Regions

United States national commissions
2010 establishments in the United States